Roma was an ironclad warship built for the Italian Regia Marina in the 1860s; she was the lead ship of the s. Armed with a main battery of five  and twelve  guns in a broadside arrangement, Roma was obsolescent by the time she entered service. As a result, her career was limited. In 1880, she took part in an international naval demonstration off Ragusa to enforce the Treaty of Berlin. In November 1881, she collided with the ironclad  in a storm in Naples, but she was not damaged. Roma was reduced to a guard ship in 1890 and then to a depot ship in 1895. In July 1896, she was scuttled to save the ship from a fire caused by a lightning strike. She was thereafter raised and broken up for scrap.

Design

Her propulsion system consisted of one single-expansion steam engine that drove a single screw propeller, with steam supplied by six coal-fired, cylindrical fire-tube boilers that were vented through a single funnel. The ship was barque-rigged to supplement the steam engine. She had a crew of 549–551 officers and men.

Roma was a broadside ironclad, and she was armed with a main battery of five  guns and twelve  guns.

Service history
The keel for Roma was laid down at the Cantiere della Foce shipyard in Genoa in February 1863. She was launched on 18 December 1865, and fitting-out work was finished by May 1869. By the time she entered service, other navies had begun to build casemate ships, rendering Roma obsolescent almost immediately after she was completed. In addition, the Italian naval budget was drastically reduced following the defeat at Lissa in 1866, which reflected a stark decrease in the government's confidence in the fleet. As a result, she saw little use during her career; indeed the budget was reduced so significantly that the fleet had great difficulty in mobilizing its ironclad squadron to attack the port of Civitavecchia in September 1870, as part of the wars of Italian unification. Instead, the ships were laid up and the sailors conscripted to man them were sent home.

In 1873, the ship was assigned to the 1st Division of the main Italian fleet unit, the Permanent Squadron, where she served as the flagship of Admiral Enrico Di Brocchetti. Together with the ships of the 2nd Division, the entire squadron cruised in the Mediterranean that year. In 1874–1875, the ship's armament was revised to eleven 10-inch guns. In November 1880, Roma and the ironclad  took part in a naval demonstration off Ragusa in an attempt to force the Ottoman Empire to comply with the terms of the Treaty of Berlin and turn over the town of Ulcinj to Montenegro. In early November 1881, Roma was moored in Naples when a severe storm tore the ship from her anchors. The heavy winds drove her into the ironclad , but neither ship was damaged in the collision.

During the annual fleet maneuvers held in 1885, Roma served in the 2nd Division of the "Western Squadron"; she was joined by the ironclad  and five torpedo boats. The "Western Squadron" attacked the defending "Eastern Squadron", simulating a Franco-Italian conflict, with operations conducted off Sardinia. The ship had her guns replaced again in 1886, this time with eleven  guns. In 1890, Roma was removed from front-line service and tasked with the defense of La Spezia; while there, she served as the flagship of the local defense forces. While serving as a guard ship, her armament was reduced to five 8-inch guns. The ship was stricken on 5 May 1895 and thereafter used as an ammunition depot ship based in La Spezia. The ship was accidentally set on fire by a lightning strike on 28 July 1896; her crew scuttled the ship to prevent her from being burned completely. Roma was refloated the following month and then broken up for scrap immediately thereafter.

Notes

References

External links
 Roma Marina Militare website 

1865 ships
Roma
Ships built in Genoa